The Texas Army National Guard is a component of the United States Army, the United States National Guard and the Texas Military Forces (along with the Texas Air National Guard and the Texas State Guard).

Texas Army National Guard units are trained and equipped as part of the United States Army.  The same ranks and insignia are used and National Guardsmen are eligible to receive all United States military awards. The Texas Guard also bestows a number of state awards for local services rendered in or to the state of Texas.

The Texas Army National Guard is composed of approximately 19,000 soldiers, and maintains 117 armories in 102 communities. State duties include disaster relief, emergency preparedness, security assistance to state law enforcement agencies, and some aspects of border security.  The Governor can activate the National Guard components under his control for state active duty in Texas, and in support of adjacent states.

History
The Texas Army National Guard has its roots in the Texas Militia formed by Stephen F. Austin at his headquarters village of San Felipe de Austin.  Austin was empowered to "organize the Colonists into a body of National Militia" in the 18 February 1823 decree authorizing Austin to form his colony in Mexican Texas.  Commissioned as Lieutenant Colonel, Austin organized the 5-company battalion at San Felipe de Austin on 22 June 1824.  Three companies were formed on the Brazos River and two on the Colorado.  This militia structure formed the basis for several of the volunteer companies raised to fight in the Texas Revolution of 1836.

The Militia Act of 1903 organized the various state militias into the present National Guard system. After World War II, the Texas National Guard was reorganized with the 36th Infantry Division and the new 49th Armored Division.

The 49th Armored Division was ordered to active federal service in October 1961 at Dallas, for the 1961 Berlin Crisis, and reverted to state control in August 1962. The 36th and 49th were inactivated in 1968 and reorganized into three separate brigades, the 36th Infantry Brigade, 71st Infantry Brigade and 72d Infantry Brigade (Mechanized) (Dallas). The division was reactivated on 1 November 1973, with its headquarters at Camp Mabry, Austin, Texas.

McGrath says the 36th Brigade insignia with star was authorized for wear from 10 May 1967 – 1 November 1973, but never worn, because the brigade at the time was designated 71st. The 36th Airborne Brigade was active from 1973, and inactivated on 1 April 1980.

In November 1976 the Texas Army National Guard, in the words of the AG Report 1975-76, was "organized into a State Headquarters and Headquarters Detachment, Public Information Detachment, the 49th Armored Division, and the Base Units Command of the State," both commanded by general officers. The 49th Armored Division had its headquarters in Austin; comprised three brigades, divisional artillery, and a Division Support Command; and was authorized a strength of 14,854 officers, warrant officers, and enlisted men. Its units were spread geographically across the entire state. The Base Units Command commanded every other unit in the TX ARNG except the division and the 100th Public Information Detachment. It consisted of one support center headquarters, one airborne brigade headquarters [the headquarters of the 36th Airborne Brigade)], one aviation group headquarters (111th), one support group headquarters, three battalions, one engineer dredge detachment, one assault support helicopter company, one air ambulance medical company, and one Combat Support Hospital (117th), with an authorized strength of 2,603 officers, warrant officers, and enlisted personnel (p. 5).

The 36th Brigade was reconstituted as a divisional formation (36th Brigade, 50th Armored Division) from 1988–92. In 1992 it became the 36th Brigade of the 49th Armored Division based at Houston, TX. It seems likely to have been active between 1992 and May 2004 when the 49th Armored Division became the 36th Infantry Division.

Major subordinate commands
36th Infantry Division
Medical Command
Office of the State Surgeon
Recruiting and Retention Battalion
State Army Aviation Office
136th Regiment (CA) (RTI)
Army Ground Safety Office
Training Centers Command
71st Theater Information Operations Group (71st TIOG)
176th Engineer Brigade

On 1 September 2009, the Texas Army National Guard activated the 1st Battalion (Airborne), 143rd Infantry Regiment, the only Airborne infantry battalion in the Army National Guard. The unit includes the battalion headquarters and headquarters company (HHC), three rifle companies (Companies A, B, and C), a heavy weapons company (Company D), and a forward support company (FSC—previously Company E). Most elements of the battalion are located in Texas, but Company C is located in Rhode Island. Rather than converting an existing TX ARNG unit, the battalion was built from the ground up. The 1st Battalion, 143rd Infantry Regiment is a separate unit and it is not subordinate to other commands in the state, although it is attached to the 71st Battlefield Surveillance Brigade for local administration. In 2016 Company B, which was originally located in Bethel, Alaska, was inactivated as part of the Alaska ARNG. Troop C (LRS), 3rd Squadron, 124th Cavalry Regiment, Texas ARNG in Terrell, Texas was then used to reform Company B. During the same year, the battalion became affiliated with the 173rd Airborne Brigade Combat Team in Vicenza, Italy, and adopted the shoulder sleeve insignia of the 173rd ABCT.

Historic units

Additional Units

References

External links
Bibliography of Texas Army National Guard History compiled by the United States Army Center of Military History
Texas National Guard homepage
Texas National Guard, accessed 28 Nov 2006
GlobalSecurity.org Texas Army National Guard, accessed 28 Nov 2006
Unit Designations in the Army Modular Force, accessed 23 Nov 2006

United States Army National Guard by state
Army National Guard